Ceriagrion cerinorubellum, commonly known as the orange-tailed marsh dart or bi-coloured damsel, is a medium-sized damselfly in the family Coenagrionidae. It is a very common species of damselflies in Asia.

Distribution 
This species can be found in Asia: Bangladesh, China, Indonesia, India, Sri Lanka, Myanmar, Malaysia, Philippines, Peninsular Malaysia, Singapore, Thailand, Vietnam.

Description and habitat
It is a medium sized damselfly with greenish eyes, bluish above. Its thorax is yellowish green. Segments 1,2 and basal half of three and apical half of 7 to 10 are in brick red color. Other segments are black on dorsal half and pale blue on the ventral half. Female is similar to the male; but more robust and with dull colors. 
  
It breeds in weeded ponds, marshes and other stillwater forms.

See also 
 List of odonata species of India
 List of odonata of Kerala

References

External links

Coenagrionidae
Insects described in 1865